10 diners - silver - Mouflon mountain goat - 2002
 20 diners - bi-metallic Ag/Au - Charlemagne's Coronation - 1996
 20 diners - bi-metallic Ag/Au - 50th anniversary Universal Declaration of Human Rights - 1998
 50 diners - bi-metallic Au/Ag - 10th Constitutional anniversary - 2003
 5 pc. set - bi-metallic Ag/Au - 2000 Olympic Games - 2000

Commemorative Coins